Robert Gordon Mackie (born March 24, 1939) is an American fashion designer and costumier, best known for his dressing of entertainment icons such as  Lucille Ball, Carol Burnett, Diahann Carroll, Carol Channing, Cher, Bette Midler, Doris Day, Marlene Dietrich, Barbara Eden, Lola Falana, Farrah Fawcett, Judy Garland, Mitzi Gaynor, Liza Minnelli, Marilyn Monroe, Marie Osmond, Diana Ross, Tina Turner, Julia Louis-Dreyfuss, and Barbra Streisand, among others. He was the costume designer for all the performers on The Carol Burnett Show during its entire eleven-year run. For his work, Mackie has received nine Primetime Emmy Awards, a Tony Award, and three nominations for the Academy Award for Best Costume Design.

Early life
Mackie was born March 24, 1939, in Monterey Park, California, to Charles Robert Mackie and Mildred Agnes ( Smith) Mackie. His father worked at Bank of America. He has an older sister. 

He was raised in early childhood by his maternal grandparents in Alhambra, California because his parents divorced. By high school he moved to Rosemead, California and lived with his father. He attended Rosemead High School.

Mackie continued his education at Pasadena City College and one-year study at Chouinard Art Institute but left without earning a degree from either school. At Chouinard, Mackie studied under Eva Roberts, the head of the fashion design department. He left Chouinard early because he got his first job sketching for Frank Thompson at Paramount Studios. Between 1960 until 1963, Mackie worked as a novice designer and assistant under designer Ray Aghayan at Paramount Studios. Aghayan would later become Mackie's long term life partner.

Professional career
In 1961, while he was working at Paramount Studios, costumer Edith Head found Mackie.
In Mackie's early career he worked as a sketch artist for French haute couturier Jean Louis, who is noted for crafting stage gowns worn by actress Marlene Dietrich during her career as a cabaret singer. As one of his first assignments, he drew the original sketch of Marilyn Monroe’s dress worn in 1962 at President John F. Kennedy's birthday celebration at Madison Square Garden in New York.

In 1966, Mackie was hired by Mitzi Gaynor to design her new stage show at the Riviera in Las Vegas. Mitzi was the first star client for whom Mackie designed an entire show. He would continue to design for Mitzi's television specials and live stage shows for the next 50 years. He won two Emmy Awards for Outstanding Achievement in Costume Design for Music-Variety for Mitzi's TV specials "Mitzi...Roarin' in the Twenties" (1976) and "Mitzi...Zings Into Spring" (1977).

In 1969, Mackie was hired to design costumes for Diana Ross, The Supremes, and The Temptations in the television special GIT: On Broadway. In 1972, he and Aghayan were nominated for Best Costume Design for Lady Sings The Blues, starring Diana Ross. Mackie and Diana Ross continued their collaborative efforts well into the 21st century, with Mackie designing stage costumes for Ross' 2010 More Today Than Yesterday: The Greatest Hits Tour.

Mackie designed costumes for the Las Vegas Strip-based burlesque shows, Hallelujah Hollywood, which was inspired by the Ziegfeld Follies and ran at the MGM Grand (now Bally's Las Vegas) from 1974 to 1980, and Jubilee!, which ran from 1981 to 2016. Both productions involve intricate, elaborate costumes and grandiose sets.

Images of many of Mackie's design drawings for these productions are available in the "Showgirls" collection from UNLV Libraries Digital Collections. He created the costumes for Cher’s 2008–11 Las Vegas Cher at the Colosseum residency at Caesars Palace, as well as for her 2017 “Classic Cher” shows in Las Vegas and Washington D.C.

Two of Mackie's best-remembered creations had a humorous aspect. While working on The Carol Burnett Show, he designed a "curtain dress" (complete with a curtain rod across the shoulders) that Carol Burnett wore in Went with the Wind!, a parody of Gone with the Wind. He designed the exotic ensemble worn by Cher at the March 1986 Academy Awards: black stretch pants, a bejeweled loincloth, knee-high boots, a black chainlink top, and a huge feathered Mohawk headdress that was one and a half times taller than her head. Introduced by Jane Fonda with the words, "Wait'll you see what's gonna come out here". "As you can see," said Cher, "I did receive my Academy booklet on how to dress like a serious actress."

Mackie designed costumes for Whitney Houston, especially splashy evening gowns which she wore for many years during concert tours and award shows. He was often referred to as "the sultan of sequins" or "the rajah of rhinestones", known for his sparkling and imaginative costume designs. He has won nine Emmy Awards for his designs, and has been nominated three times for an Academy Award. Mackie has said, "A woman who wears my clothes is not afraid to be noticed."

In 1981, Mackie guest starred as himself on two episodes of the television series The Love Boat. In 2002, Mackie was inducted into the Television Hall of Fame. In more recent years, Mackie has been mainly known as the costume designer for Cher's elaborate outfit during her latest tours, including her latest Here We Go Again Tour. In 2019, Mackie won the Tony Award for Best Costume Design in a Musical for his work on The Cher Show.

More recently in 2020, Mackie's dresses were featured and worn by television hostess Vanna White over the week of April 27 in the long-running syndicated game show Wheel of Fortune as part of honoring the San Francisco Bay Area.

Personal life
On March 14, 1960, Mackie married LuLu Porter (née Marianne Wolford), a singer, actress, and later an acting teacher. The couple had a son, Robert Gordon Mackie Jr. (known as "Robin"), the previous year. The couple divorced in 1963. Robert Mackie, a makeup artist, died in 1993 at the age of 33 of an AIDS-related illness, predeceasing his parents.

Beginning in 1963, Mackie's significant other was costume designer Ray Aghayan, whom Mackie worked with as an assistant. The two worked together through the 1970s, as well as having separate clients. They remained together until Aghayan's death in 2011.

Cultural references
 Daffy Duck in episode 9 of season 2 of The Looney Tunes Show explains that he's wearing a Bob Mackie jumpsuit in a photo of himself.
 Bart Simpson in episode 18 of season 5 of The Simpsons ("Burns' Heir") offers Milhouse Van Houten the blazer he is wearing, stating it is a "Bob Mackie original". Milhouse responds "Wow! A Bob Mackie!" before declining the offer.
Mackie is a character in the jukebox musical The Cher Show.
Referenced in Netflix's GLOW.
Referenced in episode 20 of season 10 of Modern Family ("Can’t Elope") 
Referenced in Netflix's AJ and the Queen.
In Christopher Guest's Best in Show, upon seeing what his rival is wearing, Michael McKean's character exclaims, "Bob Mackie, where are you when we need you?"
 In "Ode to Barbra Joan," Episode 20 of Season 1 of The Nanny, C.C. Babcock's father Stuart spoils main character Fran Fine by taking her shopping for designer outfits. Fran comments "All I said was that I was in the mood for a Big Mac, and you got me a Bob Mackie!"
 In HBO's Girls Season 5 Episode 6 "The Panic in Central Park", the character Marnie Michaels tries on a slinky glittery red sleeveless gown and refers to herself as a "Bob Mackie Barbie doll".

Awards and nominations

Academy Awards
The Academy Awards are awarded annually by the Academy of Motion Picture Arts and Sciences. Mackie has received 3 nominations.

American Choreography Awards
The American Choreography Awards honored outstanding choreographers in the fields of feature film, television, music videos, and commercials. Mackie has received 1 honorary award.

Costume Designers Guild Awards
The Costume Designers Guild Awards are awarded annually by the Costume Designers Guild for costume designers in motion pictures, television, and commercials. Mackie has received 1 honorary award.

Emmy Awards
The Emmy Awards are presented at one of the numerous annual American events or competitions that each recognize achievements in a particular sector of the television industry. Mackie has received 1 honorary award and 9 competitive awards from 32 nominations.

Tony Awards
The Tony Awards are presented annually by the American Theatre Wing and The Broadway League. Mackie has received 1 award from 1 nomination.

TV Land Awards
The TV Land Award generally commemorates shows now off the air, rather than in current production. Mackie has received 1 honorary award.

References

External links
 BobMackie.com
 
 
 
 

American fashion designers
American fashion businesspeople
American costume designers
Emmy Award winners
Tony Award winners
1939 births
Living people
LGBT people from California
LGBT fashion designers
People from Monterey Park, California
Chouinard Art Institute alumni
21st-century LGBT people